The 1952 National Football League season resulted in a tie for the National Conference championship between the Detroit Lions and Los Angeles Rams, requiring a one-game playoff to be held between them. This conference championship game was played on December 21, 1952, at Briggs Stadium in Detroit. The winner of that game then played the Cleveland Browns on December 28.

Tournament bracket

National Conference championship

NFL Championship game

The 1952 NFL Championship Game was held in Cleveland and was won by the Lions, 17–7.

References

1952
Playoffs
Los Angeles Rams postseason